Soylan may refer to:
 Vayk, Armenia
 Soyulan, Azerbaijan